Isaiah 54 is the fifty-fourth chapter of the Book of Isaiah in the Hebrew Bible or the Old Testament of the Christian Bible. This book contains the prophecies attributed to the prophet Isaiah, and is one of the Books of the Prophets. Chapters 40-55 are known as "Deutero-Isaiah" and date from the time of the Israelites' exile in Babylon.

Text 
The original text was written in Hebrew language. This chapter is divided into 17 verses.

Textual witnesses
Some early manuscripts containing the text of this chapter in Hebrew are of the Masoretic Text tradition, which includes the Codex Cairensis (895), the Petersburg Codex of the Prophets (916), Aleppo Codex (10th century), Codex Leningradensis (1008).

Fragments containing parts of this chapter were found among the Dead Sea Scrolls (3rd century BC or later): 
 1QIsaa: complete
1QIsab: extant verses 1–6
4QIsac (4Q57): extant verses 3–17
4QIsad (4Q58): extant verses 1–11
4QIsaq (4Q69a): extant verses 11–13

There is also a translation into Koine Greek known as the Septuagint, made in the last few centuries BCE. Extant ancient manuscripts of the Septuagint version include Codex Vaticanus (B; B; 4th century), Codex Sinaiticus (S; BHK: S; 4th century), Codex Alexandrinus (A; A; 5th century) and Codex Marchalianus (Q; Q; 6th century).

Parashot
The parashah sections listed here are based on the Aleppo Codex. Isaiah 54 is a part of the Consolations (Isaiah 40–66). {P}: open parashah; {S}: closed parashah.
 {P} 54:1-8 {S} 54:9-10 {S} 54:11-17 {S}

Verse 1

 Sing, O barren, thou that didst not bear;
 break forth into singing, and cry aloud, thou that didst not travail with child:
 for more are the children of the desolate than the children of the married wife, 
 saith the Lord.
Cross reference: Isaiah 62:4; ; 
Cited in Galatians 4:27 to highlight 'the contrast between the spiritual and the earthly Jerusalem', that is, between 'the church of Christ and the Jewish community'.

Verse 8
In a little wrath
I hid My face from you for a moment;
but with everlasting kindness
I will have mercy on you,
says the Lord your Redeemer.

Verse 9
For this is as the waters of Noah to Me;
for as I have sworn that the waters of Noah should no longer cover the earth,
so I have sworn that I would not be wrathful with you nor rebuke you.

Verse 10
 "For the mountains shall depart
And the hills be removed,
But My kindness shall not depart from you,
Nor shall My covenant of peace be removed,"
Says the Lord, who has mercy on you.
The aftermath of the flood becomes 'the occasion for God to promise the continuance of his steadfast love ("kindness"; Hebrew: chesed) and of peace (Hebrew: shalom)'.

See also
 Blacksmith
 Noah
 Noah's flood
Related Bible parts: , Galatians 4

Notes and references

Sources

External links

Jewish
Isaiah 54 Original Hebrew with Parallel English

Christian
Isaiah 54 English Translation with Parallel Latin Vulgate

54